The Belgian Consumer Price Index (commonly referred to as the Index) is a list of prices of goods and services, kept by the Belgian Federal Public Service Economy. The Index is updated on a monthly basis, and reflects the evolution in the cost of living.

The Belgian system tracks two indices: the general Consumer Price Index and the Health Index. The latter uses the same basket of goods/products as the former, with the exception of products which could be detrimental to health, such as cigarettes and petrol.

Compensation for inflation
In Belgium, many wages, pensions, property rental costs, insurance premiums, unemployment benefits, health insurance payments, etc. are by law tied to the Health Index. Some wages and benefits are adapted to the Index after a rise of the Index above a certain threshold. Other adjustments, like house rent or insurance premiums, are carried through on a yearly basis. Thus, the income of the average Belgian closely tracks overall inflation - which makes it different from the rest of the eurozone.

Government cabinets can decide to "jump" the index, i.e. knowingly skip the automatic adaptation of all wages and benefits tied to the index. This is a political decision that keeps these wages and benefits on the then-current level, in order to reduce the government's budget deficit. The Wilfried Martens government in the 1980s did three such "index jumps", and the Michel I Government did one as well in 2015.

See also
Consumer Price Index

External links 
 Belgian Consumer Price Index

Economy of Belgium
Price indices